James Robinson (1860 – 16 September 1922) was an Irish-born Australian politician.

He was born at Aughantane near Clogher in County Tyrone to farmer John Robinson and Jane Moore. On 15 June 1886 he married Elizabeth Colquhoun Robinson, with whom he had a daughter. He migrated to Australia in 1886 and from 1888 ran his own business in Kogarah. In 1896 he sold out and worked for Griffiths Brothers as a manager from 1921. He was involved with the Nationalist Party, serving on its council from 1917 to 1922 and as president of the Kogarah and Croydon branches. On 4 July 1922 he was appointed to the New South Wales Legislative Council, but he died less than three months later at Croydon on 16 September 1922.

References

1860 births
1922 deaths
Nationalist Party of Australia members of the Parliament of New South Wales
Members of the New South Wales Legislative Council